Scaphognathops theunensis is a critically endangered< species of cyprinid fish of the genus Scaphognathops. It inhabits inland wetlands in Laos, and as of 2011 its population was decreasing. It is used for food locally.

References

Cyprinidae
Cyprinid fish of Asia
Fish of Laos
IUCN Red List critically endangered species
Fish described in 1998